The 1984 NCAA Men's Water Polo Championship was the 16th annual NCAA Men's Water Polo Championship to determine the national champion of NCAA men's collegiate water polo. Tournament matches were played at the Belmont Plaza Pool in Long Beach, California during December 1984.

California defeated Stanford in the final, 9–8, to win their sixth national title. Coached by Pete Cutino, the Golden Bears finished the season 26–4–1.

Mike Grier (Pepperdine) was named the Most Outstanding Player of the tournament. An All-Tournament Team, consisting of seven players, was also named. 

The tournament's leading scorers were Alan Gresham (California) and Charlie Harris (USC), with 11 goals each.

Qualification
Since there has only ever been one single national championship for water polo, all NCAA men's water polo programs (whether from Division I, Division II, or Division III) were eligible. A total of 8 teams were invited to contest this championship.

Bracket
Site: Belmont Plaza Pool, Long Beach, California

{{8TeamBracket-Consols
| team-width=150
| RD3=First round
| RD4=Championship semifinals
| RD2=Consolation semifinals
| RD5=Championship
| RD5b=Third place
| RD1=Fifth place
| RD1b=Seventh place

| RD3-seed1= | RD3-team1=Stanford | RD3-score1=16
| RD3-seed2= | RD3-team2=Navy | RD3-score2=8
| RD3-seed3= | RD3-team3=Pepperdine | RD3-score3=12
| RD3-seed4= | RD3-team4=UCLA | RD3-score4=11
| RD3-seed5= | RD3-team5=California | RD3-score5=11
| RD3-seed6= | RD3-team6=Loyola–Chicago | RD3-score6=3
| RD3-seed7= | RD3-team7=USC | RD3-score7=12
| RD3-seed8= | RD3-team8= Brown | RD3-score8=11

| RD4-seed1= | RD4-team1=Stanford | RD4-score1=11
| RD4-seed2= | RD4-team2=Pepperdine | RD4-score2=6
| RD4-seed3= | RD4-team3=California | RD4-score3=10
| RD4-seed4= | RD4-team4=USC| RD4-score4=9

| RD2-seed1= | RD2-team1=Navy | RD2-score1=4
| RD2-seed2= | RD2-team2=UCLA | RD2-score2=17
| RD2-seed3= | RD2-team3=Loyola–Chicago | RD2-score3=5
| RD2-seed4= | RD2-team4=Brown | RD2-score4=11

| RD5-seed1= | RD5-team1=Stanford | RD5-score1=8
| RD5-seed2= | RD5-team2=California | RD5-score2=9

| RD5b-seed1= | RD5b-team1=Pepperdine | RD5b-score1=10
| RD5b-seed2= | RD5b-team2=USC | RD5b-score2=13

| RD1-seed1= | RD1-team1=UCLA | RD1-score1=11
| RD1-seed2= | RD1-team2=Brown | RD1-score2=10

| RD1b-seed1= | RD1b-team1=Navy | RD1b-score1=7
| RD1b-seed2= | RD1b-team2=Loyola–Chicago | RD1b-score2=10}}

 All-tournament team Mike Grier, Pepperdine''' (Most outstanding player)
Shaun Cleary, California
Eric Davidson, USC
Alan Gresham, California
Charlie Harris, USC
Craig Klass, Stanford
Mike Spicer, USC

See also 
 NCAA Men's Water Polo Championship

References

NCAA Men's Water Polo Championship
NCAA Men's Water Polo Championship
1984 in sports in California
December 1984 sports events in the United States
1984